Waverley Christian College is a co-educational independent Christian school with two campuses - Wantirna South and Narre Warren South. The College offers Christian education to pre-school, primary, and secondary students.

History
Originally established in 1978 as Parkmore Full Gospel College by Parkmore Full Gospel Church, the church and school merged with Waverley Christian Fellowship (now CityLife Church) in 1983. The College moved to its present site in Wantirna South in 1989.

The College has 2305 students enrolled in 2023 from Kindergarten to Year 12 across both campuses. The Wantirna South campus has 1292 students. The Narre Warren South campus has 1013 students.

Houses
The College has a four-house system. Each student is placed in a house named in honour of Christians who made a significant contribution to the promotion of the Bible in Christian history. The house system conducts weekly student meetings and aims to encourage healthy competition, build team spirit and develop student leadership. Points are awarded in academic, sporting and spiritual areas of the College.

Red - Wycliffe – named after a 14th-century theologian
Green - Tyndale – named after a 16th-century Protestant reformer and scholar
Yellow - Finney – named after an 18th-century American revivalist and minister
Blue - Spurgeon – named after a 19th-century preacher

Christian education
Waverley Christian College encourages students to have a rich involvement in their faith and Christian lifestyle. Students and teachers participate in weekly Chapel which includes, worship lead by the schools own Chapel band, and a talk from a passionate speaker. During that chapel worship takes place, which includes 2-4 songs depending on what age category.

Narre Warren South campus 
Narre Warren South campus was established in 2012. There were over 900 students enrolled in 2021 from Prep to Year 12. Facilities include a library, arts and technology specialist classrooms, as well as science and computer laboratories. The Junior Primary Centre was refurbished for the beginning of the 2016 school year. Construction of a new multi purpose centre, incorporating a gymnasium and performing arts theatre, was completed in April 2016. A new Primary School building was completed at the beginning of the 2017 school year.

See also 
Llewellyn Park

References

Nondenominational Christian schools in Melbourne
Educational institutions established in 1978
1978 establishments in Australia
Buildings and structures in the City of Knox
School buildings completed in 1989